The Bretagne was a fast 130-gun three-deck ship of the French Navy, designed by engineer Jules Marielle. Built as a new capital ship meant to improve on the very successful Océan class, while avoiding the weaknesses found on Valmy, she retained most of the Océan's design, and incorporated the philosophy of "fast ship of the line" pioneered by Napoléon, with a rounded stern and a two-cylinder, 8-boiler steam engine allowing her a speed of 13.5 knots. The propeller could be retracted to streamline the hull when sailing under sail only.

Launched in 1855, she was too late to take part in the Crimean War. She was decommissioned in 1865, becoming a schoolship for boys and sailors in Brest. Struck from the Navy lists in 1880, she was broken up that year.

Design and construction 
Bretagne was the offspring of an attempt to improve upon the Océan class by increasing the beam from 16.24 to 16.64 metres.

The 1849 budget initially allowed for construction of a new three-decker capital ship named Terrible in Brest, but the ship was cancelled in 1848 to slim down expenses. The 1850 budget then scheduled two ships, named Bretagne and Desaix (in honour of Louis Desaix), to be built in Brest and Cherbourg respectively; the order was placed on 15 March 1851. The mediocre performances of Valmy during her trials led to the Navy shedding the capital ship design of the Commission de Paris and start back from Sané's Océan design, with only incremental modifications. In late 1851, engineers De Gasté, responsible for Bretagne, and Forquenot, for Desaix, decided on a reduction of the tumblehome by 20 centimetres and on a slight increase of the beam — alterations thought safe, as the two last ships of the Océan design, Ville de Paris and Louis-XIV, had had their tumblehome reduced by 23 centimetres with no ill effect. An initial suggestion to fit the ships with 160 shp steam engines allowing for a speed of 4.5 knots was declined as to minimise departures from Sané's design.

Bretagne was laid down on 4 August 1851 and Desaix on 27 Octobre. On 17 June 1852, the Ministry of the Navy suspended construction and required that the ships be lengthened by 3.43 metres and that 540 shp steam engines be incorporated. Brest responded to the requirements in September 1852, but at the same point, Dupuy de Lôme's fast ship of the line Napoléon was completing her trials, exhibiting such outstanding performances that on 10 September 1852 the Ministry cancelled the Bretagne class and ordered existing sailing ships to be converted to steamers, using as many existing parts as possible. At this point, the keel, bow and aft of Bretagne had been erected, amounting to the third of the 24 construction steps defined by regulations in ship construction; she was taken apart and rebuilt according to Marielle's plans, which had been approved in December 1852. At the same time, the order for the steam engine was placed. Desaix, whose keel was only beginning to be laid, was cancelled altogether and Arcole, second ship of the Algésiras type, the production series of the Napoléon design, was started instead.

Launching of Bretagne took place on 17 February 1855; in spite of a 2 °C, snow and strong wind, a large populace gathered to watch the operation.

The new design gave a length of 81 metres and a beam of 18.08; this made Bretagne 8 metres longer and 2 metres wider than Napoléon. With a draught of 8.35 metre, the ship had a volume of just under 20,000 m³. The engine, provided by the Indret workshop, occupied a 30-metre long compartment and was designed for 1200 shp but could develop up to 3,327 shp in peak power from eight boilers, each with six furnaces. Though direct transmission by an axis, it moved a four-blade, 6.3-metre propeller which could be retracted into a vertical shaft, only 1.3 metre wide thanks to the geometry of the blades. The ship carried 590 tonnes of coal, giving her an autonomy of 14 days at 10 knots, and 6 days at her top speed of 14 knots. With three month worth of food for the 1,200-man complement, and one month worth fresh water completed by a distillation device to desalinate seawater, she could stay at sea for 40 days.

The main battery of Bretagne used 36-pounder long guns, the heaviest available calibre, instead of the more modern 30-pounder long gun on which other ships standardised their armament. The aft of the ship was round and featured gun ports, like on Napoléon on her successors. Although she carried 130 guns of various calibres, Bretagne featured no less than 180 gun ports; this allowed the crew to reinforce the artillery on one arc if needed and time permitting, such as before a shore bombardment, and fire up to 80 guns on one target.

The figurehead figured the prophet Veleda, an important character in the folklore of Bretagne, with a sickle in hand and a wearing an oak leaf crown. The transom featured the coat of arms of Bretagne, carried by two geniī, and the name of the ship underneath. The ship was painted in black, with white stripes along the level of the gunports and copper-red paint underwater.

As completed, Bretagne proved much heavier than anticipated: designed to displace 6466 tonnes for an 8.20-metre draught, she actually displaced 6873, yielding a 9-metre draught that lowered the lower battery to only 1.45 meters above water, instead of the intended 1.75 metres.

The ultimate increase in French capital ship design, Bretagne increased the number of heavy guns on the lower battery to 18 on each side, from the 15 of the Bretagne of 1766 and 16 on the Océans. In the original design, half of these guns were 36-pounder long guns, as to maximise firepower at the price of standardisation on 30-pounder long guns that typically prevailed at the time, the other half being 60-pounder Paixhans guns. The middle deck fielded 18 30-pounder short guns and another 18 Paixhans guns of 60 pounds. The upper battery was armed with thirty-eight 30-pounder howitzers. Two 50-pounders and eighteen 30-pounder caronades complemented the armament on the deck. This gave Bretagne a broadside of 2,924 pounds (1,431 kilograms), compared to the 2,400 of the original Océan design.

In 1869, after the ship became a school ship for the École Navale, this armament was replaced with two rifled 19 cm guns on the lower deck; sixteen 30-pounder guns, four riffled 16-centimetre guns of the 1864 pattern, eight riffled 16-centimetre guns modified after the 1860 or the 1862 pattern, two muzzle-loading 16-centimetre riffled guns, and 2 14-centimetre guns on the middle battery; and 2 bronze 12-centimetre guns on the deck.

Operational history 
Completed two years after her British homologue HMS Duke of Wellington, Bretagne became the most powerful warship in the world, but commissioned too late to effectively take part in the Crimean War, which was almost over after the fall of Kinburn in October 1855. Appointed flagship of the Toulon squadron in January 1856, she sailed to the Black Sea to serve during the last months of the conflict, which came to an end in July, and helped return the French expeditionary corps back to France. She was then part of the training squadron in Toulon, cruising between Sardinia and Spain.

Bretagne took part in the naval parade given in honour of Queen Victoria by Napoléon III in Cherbourg Roads on 5 August 1858. The French Emperor intended to prove to the British that the recent improvements to Cherbourg military harbour were not meant as a threat to Great Britain, and invited the British monarch, Prince Albert and a large British delegation to visit the installations, as a token of good faith. The visit was counter-productive, as the display of power of the French fleet, compounded by bouts of diplomatic clumsiness such as inaugurating an equestrian statue of Napoléon I, irritated and worried the British. After the British delegation departed in haste, Bretagne took the French Emperor and Empress aboard and ferried them to Brest for the next leg of their official tour.

Bretagne served as a troopship during the Second Italian War of Independence in 1859, and a few months later the led the bombing of Tétouan forts in Morocco, where a cannonball hit her hull. In 1860, she sailed to Napoli for the funeral of Prince Jérôme Napoléon. She then sailed to Gaeta in October, under Admiral Adelbert Lebarbier de Tinan, to oppose a Sardinian attack against Napolitan forces, leading to the Battle of Garigliano. She spend most of 1861 ferrying  French troops deployed in Syria back to France, before returning to Toulon.

In 1865, Bretagne was transformed into a schoolship for boys and sailors, leading to the removal of her engine. In 1869, the artillery was replaced by an assortment of various types of guns for didactic purpose. The 30-gun corvette Galathée served as her tender. On 28 January 1880, Bretagne was struck for the Navy lists and renamed Ville de Bordeaux, exchanging her name and equipment with Ville de Bordeaux, and was towed to Landévennec to be broken up.

Notes, citations, and references

Notes

Citations

References

 Howard Douglas, A Treatise on Naval Gunnery, London, John Murray, Albermale Street, 1851, 3rd edition, 638 p.
  Ad. Bouin, Nouvelles annales de la Marine et des Colonies, revue mensuelle, tome 9, Paris, Imprimerie et Librairie administratives de Paul Dupont, 47 rue de Grenelle-Saint-Honoré, 1853
  Armand Fouquier, Annuaire historique universel ; ou, Histoire politique pour 1855, Paris, Lebrun et Cie, libraires, 8 rue des Saints-Pères, 1856, 347 p.
  Henri-Joseph Paixhans, Constitution militaire de la France, Paris, Librairie militaire de J. Dumaine, 36 rue et passage Dauphine, 1849, 357 p.
  Voyage de leurs majestés l'empereur et l'impératrice dans les départements de l'Ouest (Normandie et Bretagne) texte officiel du Moniteur, gravures de L'Illustration, no 806, August 1858.
  L'Illustration : journal universel, vol. 25, J. J. Dubochet, 1855, 453 p.

External links 
 
 

 

Ships of the line of the French Navy
Ships built in France
1855 ships
Crimean War naval ships of France